

The Emergency Quota Act, also known as the Emergency Immigration Act of 1921, the Immigration Restriction Act of 1921, the Per Centum Law, and the Johnson Quota Act (ch. 8,  of May 19, 1921), was formulated mainly in response to the large influx of Southern and Eastern Europeans and successfully restricted their immigration as well as that of other "undesirables" to the United States. Although intended as temporary legislation, it "proved, in the long run, the most important turning-point in American immigration policy" because it added two new features to American immigration law: numerical limits on immigration and the use of a quota system for establishing those limits, which came to be known as the National Origins Formula.

The Emergency Quota Act restricted the number of immigrants admitted from any country annually to 3% of the number of residents from that country living in the United States as of the 1910 Census.  That meant that people from Northern and Western Europe had a higher quota and were more likely to be admitted to the US than those from Eastern or Southern Europe or from non-European countries.

However, professionals were to be admitted without regard to their country of origin. Also, no limits were set on immigration from Canada, Newfoundland (an independent dominion at the time), Cuba, Mexico, or the countries of Central America and South America or "adjacent islands. The act did not apply to countries with bilateral agreements with the US or to Asian countries listed in the Immigration Act of 1917, known as the Asiatic Barred Zone Act. However, the act was not seen as restrictive enough since millions of immigrants from Eastern and Southern Europe had come into the US since 1890.

The Immigration Act of 1924 reduced the quota to 2% of countries' representation in the 1890 census, when a fairly small percentage of the population was from the regions that were regarded as less than desirable. To execute the new quota, the visa system that is still in use today was implemented in 1924. It mandated all non-citizens seeking to enter the US to obtain and present a visa obtained from a US embassy or consulate before they arrived to the US.

Immigration inspectors handled the visa packets depending on whether they were non-immigrant (visitor) or immigrant (permanent admission). Non-immigrant visas were kept at the ports of entry and were later destroyed, but immigrant visas were sent to the Central Office, in Washington, DC, for processing and filing.

Based on the formula, the number of new immigrants admitted fell from 805,228 in 1920 to 309,556 in 1921–22.   The average annual inflow of immigrants prior to 1921 was 175,983 from Northern and Western Europe and 685,531 from other countries, mainly Southern and Eastern Europe. In 1921, there was a drastic reduction in immigration levels from other countries, principally Southern and Eastern Europe.

After the end of World War I, both Europe and the United States were experiencing economic and social upheaval. In Europe, the war's destruction, the Russian Revolution, and the dissolutions of both the Austria-Hungary and the Ottoman Empire led to an increase of immigration to the United States. In the US, the wages during the war increased significantly (and prices with them), but an economic downturn after the postwar demobilization, and another one in 1920–1921 increased unemployment. The combination of increased immigration from Europe at the time of higher American unemployment strengthened the anti-immigrant movement.

The act, sponsored by US Representative Albert Johnson (R-Washington), was passed without a recorded vote in the US House of Representatives and by a vote of 90-2-4 in the US Senate.

The act was revised by the Immigration Act of 1924.

The use of the National Origins Formula continued until it was replaced by the Immigration and Nationality Act of 1965, which introduced a system of preferences, based on immigrants' skills and family relationships with US citizens or US residents.

Quotas by country under successive laws 
Listed below are historical quotas on immigration from the Eastern Hemisphere, by country, as applied in given fiscal years ending June 30, calculated according to successive immigration laws and revisions from the Emergency Quota Act of 1921 to the final quota year of 1965. The 1922 and 1925 systems based on dated census records of the foreign-born population were intended as temporary measures, and were replaced by the 1924 Act's National Origins Formula based on the 1920 Census of the total U.S. population, effective July 1, 1929.

See also 
 Dillingham Commission
 List of United States immigration legislation

References

Further reading
 Nathan Miller, New World Coming. Cambridge: Da Capo Press, 2003
 John Higham, Strangers in the Land: Patterns of American Nativism. 2nd ed. New York: Atheneum, 1963.  (First edition published by Rutgers University Press in 1955)

External links
 The act Dead Link at the U.S. Immigration Legislation Online  hosted by the University of Washington Bothell Library

History of immigration to the United States
1921 in the United States
Federal legislation
1921 in law
67th United States Congress
Quotas